Air France  primarily refers to airline based in Paris, France:
 Air France, the French national carrier
 Air France-KLM, the parent company of Air France and KLM, sometimes abbreviated as Air France

Air France may also refer to:
 Air France (band), the Swedish band
 Basketball player Mickaël Piétrus,  who has been nicknamed "Air France"